Ugna is a village in Jagdishpur block of Bhojpur district, Bihar, India. As of 2011, its population was 2,672, in 391 households.

References 

Villages in Bhojpur district, India